Tony Kendall (22 August 1936 – 28 November 2009) was an Italian model turned film actor with over 50 film credits that reflect the trends of popular European cinema in the 1960s, 1970s, and 1980s.

Biography
Born as Luciano Stella, Kendall was formerly a model for Italian Fumetti, comics done in photographs.

He changed his name to Tony Kendall at the suggestion of Vittorio De Sica in the fashion of many Italian actors whose films were shown in countries outside of Italy in the days when European films proliferated. Stella made his film debut in Femmine Tre Volte in 1959 but didn't make another appearance until he used his new name of Tony Kendall in Brennus, Enemy of Rome (1963) one of the sword and sandal craze of films popular in the early 1960s.

Kendall is most famous for his various teamings with Brad Harris, with the two predating Terence Hill and Bud Spencer as a popular and prolific action team. In the derivative world of the European cinema of the 1960s, Kendall and Harris first teamed up in two sauerkraut western films "inspired" by the successful German Karl May Winnetou series with Harris as a Lex Barker clone and Kendall as a Native American "Chief Black Eagle" in The Pirates of the Mississippi (1963) and Black Eagle of Santa Fe (1965).

With the international success of the James Bond films and the German Jerry Cotton series, Kendall became best known for his role as private detective Joe Walker in the seven films of the Eurospy Kommissar X series where he played opposite Brad Harris in the role of New York Police Captain Tom Rowland. The popularity of Batman (TV series) led to Harris and Kendall appearing in The Three Fantastic Supermen (1967) the first in a long series that had stunt work performed by a young Jackie Chan (“The Three Fantastic Supermen in the Orient”).

Kendall has prominently appeared in other varieties of European cinema in the 1960s and 1970s such as Giallo horror (The Whip and the Body, 1963), spaghetti westerns (as Django in Django Against Sartana, 1970, and Gunman of 100 Crosses, 1971), crime movies such as Machine Gun McCain (1969), and adventure films such as Oil! (1977). He also appeared in European versions of women in prison (The Big Bust Out, 1972), zombie horror (Return of the Blind Dead, 1973), and films inspired by The Godfather (Corleone, 1978). Aside from an appearance in Alex l'ariete (2000), Kendall's last film role was in On the Dark Continent in 1993.

Partial filmography

Femmine tre volte (1957)
The Whip and the Body (1963) - Christian Menliff
The Pirates of the Mississippi (1963) - Schwarzer Adler
Brennus, Enemy of Rome (1963) - Quinto Fabio
The Hyena of London (1964) - Henry
The Masked Man Against the Pirates (1964) - Captain Ruiz
Black Eagle of Santa Fe (1965) - Chief Black Eagle
Serenade for Two Spies (1965) - Pepino
Kiss Kiss, Kill Kill (1966) - Jo Louis Walker / 'Kommissar X'
Kommissar X – Drei gelbe Katzen (1966) - Jo Walker / Kommissar X
Kommissar X – In den Klauen des goldenen Drachen (1966) - Jo Walker / Kommissar X
The Three Fantastic Supermen (1967) - Tony
Kommissar X – Drei grüne Hunde (1967) - Jo Walker / Kommissar X
I criminali della metropoli (1967) - Sergente Perier
Kommissar X - Drei blaue Panther (1968) - Jo Walker / Kommissar X
Machine Gun McCain (1969) - Pete Zacari
Kommissar X – Drei goldene Schlangen (1969) - Jo Walker / Kommissar X
Hate Is My God (1969) - Il Nero / Carl
Komm, süßer Tod (1969) - Nino
Django Defies Sartana (1970) - Django
Fighters from Ave Maria (1970) - John
Crepa padrone, crepa tranquillo (1970)
Brother Outlaw (1971) - Dakota
In the Eye of the Hurricane (1971) - Miguel
Gunman of One Hundred Crosses (1971) - Santana / Sartana / Django
Tiger Gang (1971) - Jo Louis Walker / 'Kommissar X'
Cerco de terror (1972) - Andrew
Blood Story (1972) - Abraham French
The Big Bust Out (1972) - Jeff
The Loreley's Grasp (1973) - Sigurd, the Hunter
La ragazza fuoristrada (1973) - Carlo
Li chiamavano i tre moschettieri... invece erano quattro (1973) - D'Artagnan
Return of the Blind Dead (1973) - Jack Marlowe
La dernière bourrée à Paris (1973) - Victor
I giochi proibiti dell'Aretino Pietro (1973) - Bitto Ranieri (segment "The Trick") / Fra' Luce (segment "The Miracle")
La notte dell'ultimo giorno (1973) - Beppe Banti
Bruna, formosa, cerca superdotato (1973) - Giovanni Pizzolla
The Loreley's Grasp (1975) - Pietro Rossini
Oil! (1977) - Tony
Yeti (1977) - Cliff Chandler
Zanna Bianca e il grande Kid (1977) - Franky James
Corleone (1978) - Salvatore Sperlazzo
Cop or Hood (1979) - Rey
Le Guignolo (1980) - Fredo
Delitto sull'autostrada (1982) - Mr. Tarquini
Attila flagello di Dio (1982) - Serpicio
 Death Stone (1987) - Miguel Gomez
Thrilling Love (1989) - Alberto Stuart
The Rubber Wall (1991) - Colonnello Aeronautica
Nel continente nero (1993) - Ernesto
Alex l'ariete (2000) - Comandante
Voce del verbo amore (2007) - Ettore

Death
Tony Kendall died in a hospital in Trigoria, Rome, Italy on 28 November 2009, aged 73, from an undisclosed illness.

References

External links
 

1936 births
2009 deaths
Italian male film actors
Male actors from Rome
Male Spaghetti Western actors
People of Lazian descent